Software usually refers to instructions for computer hardware to execute.

Software may also refer to:
IEEE Software, a magazine
Software (novel), part of the Ware Tetralogy, a 1982 cyber-punk novel by Rudy Rucker
Software (album), 1999 album by Grace Slick
Software (band), a German electronic duo active between 1984 and 2000
Software, Etc., a predecessor of the video game retailer GameStop
GNOME Software, a GNOME software package for managing software installation